Thomas Jeter (August 30, 1898 – October 23, 1979) was an American fencer. He competed in the individual and team foil events at the 1924 Summer Olympics.

References

External links
 

1898 births
1979 deaths
American male foil fencers
Olympic fencers of the United States
Fencers at the 1924 Summer Olympics
Sportspeople from Florence, Alabama